Wustrow is a municipality in the Vorpommern-Rügen district, in Mecklenburg-Vorpommern, Germany.

Notable residents
 Klaus Praefcke (1933-2013), chemist
 Uwe Stock (* 1947), judoka

References

Seaside resorts in Germany
Cities and towns in Mecklenburg
Populated coastal places in Germany (Baltic Sea)